Lestes dissimulans is a species of damselfly in the family Lestidae, the spreadwings. It is known by the common name cryptic spreadwing.

It is native to central Africa, where it is widespread. It occurs in swampy habitat at pools and streams.

References

Lestidae
Insects described in 1955
Taxonomy articles created by Polbot